Noveurops philippinensis is a species of beetle in the family Monotomidae, the only species in the genus Noveurops.

References

Monotomidae
Monotypic Cucujoidea genera